NGC 4072 is a lenticular galaxy located 300 million light-years away in the constellation Coma Berenices. The galaxy was discovered by astronomer Ralph Copeland on April 3, 1872 and is a member of the NGC 4065 Group.

NGC 4072 is classified as a LINER galaxy.

See also
 List of NGC objects (4001–5000)

References

External links

4072
038176
Coma Berenices
Astronomical objects discovered in 1872
Lenticular galaxies
NGC 4065 Group
Discoveries by Ralph Copeland
LINER galaxies